Events from the year 1757 in Austria

Incumbents
 Monarch – Maria Theresa

Events

 May 6 – Seven Years' War – Battle of Prague: The Prussians under Frederick the Great defeats an Austrian army and begins to besiege the city of Prague.
 June 18 – Seven Years' War – Battle of Kolín: Prussia is defeated by an Austrian army under Marshal Daun, forcing the Prussian army to evacuate Bohemia.
 November 22 – Seven Years' War – Battle of Breslau: The Austrian army under Prince Charles Alexander of Lorraine defeats the Prussian army of Wilhelm of Brunswick-Bevern and the Prussians retires behind the Oder.
 December 6
 Seven Years' War – Battle of Leuthen: Frederick defeats Prince Charles's Austrian army.
December 7–December 20
 Seven Years' War  – Siege of Breslau: Frederick retakes the city of Breslau.

Births

Deaths

References

 
Years of the 18th century in Austria